Revelation is a historical mystery novel by British author C. J. Sansom. It is Sansom's fifth novel, and the fourth in the Matthew Shardlake Series. Set in 1543 during the reign of King Henry VIII, it follows hunchbacked lawyer Shardlake and his assistant, Jack Barak as they hunt the killer of a fellow lawyer - who turns out to be a religiously fanatic serial killer, insane but highly intelligent and capable.

Plot
The plot centres around the challenges of Reformation England, draws on the prophesies of the Book of Revelation and features Archbishop Cranmer.

Awards and nominations
Revelation was short listed for the Books Direct Crime Thriller of the Year 2009 and the Crime Writers Association Ellis Peters Historical Dagger in 2008.

References

2008 British novels
Crime novels
Novels by C. J. Sansom
Novels set in London
Novels set in Tudor England
Novels set in the 1540s
Catherine Parr
Macmillan Publishers books